James Adams (4 January 1908 – 19 August 1979) was an English footballer who played as a goalkeeper in the Football League for West Bromwich Albion.

He was with the club when they won the FA Cup in 1931 and reached the final again in 1935, but at that time Harold Pearson was first choice in the position, a situation which did not change until the 1936–37 season. Adams eventually made 100 league appearances for the Baggies across a ten-year period leading up to the outbreak of the Second World War, and as many again in the unofficial competitions held during the conflict, before retiring in 1945. He also played for Cannock Chase Colliery and Cannock Town.

References

1908 births
1979 deaths
People from Norton Canes
English footballers
Association football goalkeepers
Cannock Town F.C. players
West Bromwich Albion F.C. players
English Football League players
Footballers from Staffordshire